Pedro José Cevallos Salvador (1830–Novemver 11, 1892) was President of Ecuador from 1 July 1888 to 17 August 1888 and Vice President from 1886 to 1890. From April to August 1891 the presidency of Antonio Flores he was minister of Public Instruction, Interior Affairs and Foreign Affairs. Shortly before his death he became a member of the Ecuadoran Academy of Literature.

References

External links
 Official Website of the Ecuadorian Government about the country President's History

1830 births
1892 deaths
Presidents of Ecuador
Vice presidents of Ecuador
Government ministers of Ecuador
Foreign ministers of Ecuador